Olivia Baker (born June 12, 1996) is an American middle-distance runner who specializes in the 800 meters. Raised in South Orange, New Jersey, Baker attended Columbia High School, Baker graduated from Stanford University.

High School Career 
Baker was a stand out athlete at Columbia High School. During her time there she never lost a 400 to anyone from New Jersey and won 13 state titles. She also anchored Columbia to a state 4x400 record of 3:40.36 and ran on the sprint medley relay that recorded the No. 2 U.S. high school time ever. In 2013, she became the first to win four events the same year at the New Jersey Meet of Champions, capturing state titles in the 100, 200, 400, and anchoring the 4x400. That same season she also won the 2013 New Balance Outdoor Nationals title in the 400. She was a two-time New Jersey Gatorade Girls Track and Field Athlete of the Year.

While in high school Baker also got to compete for the United States. At the 2013 World U18 Championships  she finished 2nd in the 400m and was on the winning Medley relay team. At the 2014 World U20 Championships she finished 3rd in the 400m and was part of the winning 4x400m relay team.

Collegiate Career 
Baker ran at Stanford and was a 11-Time All-American, the 2016 Pac-12 400 champion, and the 2016 West Region Track Athlete of Year. In 2015 she was on the winning 4x400m team at the Pan Am U20 Championships.

Professional Career 
Baker runs for the Atlanta Track Club where she also works as the coordinator for marketing and membership engagement.In May of 2019 she was in the winning mixed 4x400m team at the IAAF World Relays. In 2022 she ran the 800m at the World Athletics Indoor Championships.

Achievements

References

External links

 
 
 
 
 Olivia Baker Interviews

1996 births
Living people
American female middle-distance runners
Columbia High School (New Jersey) alumni
Track and field athletes from New Jersey
People from South Orange, New Jersey
Sportspeople from Essex County, New Jersey
African-American female track and field athletes
21st-century African-American sportspeople
21st-century African-American women